In Mainland China, there are  46 crimes punishable by death. These are defined in the criminal law of China, which comprehensively identifies criminal acts and their corresponding liabilities. 

A 2011 amendment to this law for the purpose of legal provisions improvement reduced the number of capital crimes by 19.1% and gave more lenient punishments to minors and the elderly (75 years old and above).

In 2015, the criminal code was amended to remove nine capital offenses:  
 Smuggling weapons or ammunition
 Smuggling nuclear materials 
 Smuggling counterfeit money 
 Counterfeiting 
 Investment fraud/fraudulent fundraising. 
 Organizing prostitution
 Forcing prostitution
 Obstructing military affairs
 Spreading rumors and undermining morale during wartime.

List of capital offenses

Crimes Endangering National Security 
Endangering national security is among the crime categories included in the 1997 revision of China's criminal code. It comprises Articles 102 to 113 of the 1997 Criminal Law and imposes the confiscation of property as a supplementary penalty. The crimes included are:

 Treason
 Separatism
 Armed rebellion, rioting
 Collaborating with the enemy
 Spying or espionage
 Selling state secrets
 Providing material support to the enemy

Crimes Endangering Public Security 
  Arson 
 Flooding
 Manslaughter
 Bombing
 Spreading poisons
 Spreading hazardous substances (e.g., radioactive, toxic, pathogenic)
 Seriously endangering public safety, broadly construed
 Sabotaging electricity
 Sabotaging gas, fuel, petroleum, or other flammables or explosives
 Hijacking aircraft
 Illegal possession, transport or selling of explosives or firearms
 Illegally manufacturing, selling, transporting or storing hazardous materials
 Theft of explosives or other dangerous material
 Theft of firearms, ammunition or other dangerous material

Economic crimes
 Production or sale of counterfeit medicine
 Production or sale of hazardous food products

Crimes against people
 Intentional homicide
 Intentional assault
 Rape
 Kidnapping
 Human trafficking

Crimes against property
Robbery

Crimes against public order
Prison escape, jailbreaking
Raiding a prison
Smuggling, dealing, transporting or manufacturing drugs

Crimes against national defense
 Sabotaging weapons, military installations, or military communications
Providing substandard weapons or military installations

Corruption and bribery
Embezzlement

Breach of duty by soldiers
Insubordination
Concealment or false reporting of military intelligence
Refusing to pass or falsely passing orders
Surrender
Defection with aircraft or ships
Selling military secrets
Theft of military weaponry or supplies
Illegally selling or transferring military weaponry or supplies
Killing innocent inhabitants of war zones or plundering their property
Cowardice

References

Further reading

External links 
Full text of China's Criminal Code